Vanni Mouse is a short film produced and directed by Tamiliam, a Sri Lankan Tamil from the diaspora. It won the best award in an international festival. It won the best film award in the fiction category in the nine-day 11th International Short and Independent Film Festival (ISIFF) in Dhaka 2010. Commenting on the award, Barrister S. J. Joseph of Eelavar Cine Arts Council, based in London, told TamilNet this was the first time a Sri Lankan Tamil artist had been awarded at an international film festival.

"As far as content is concerned, the film is against violence perpetrated in the name of national integrity. To convey this message, the director picked up a form, which is an interesting combination of wild life cinematography, surrealistic backdrop and realistic incident. A monotonous journey of some mice ends up in an unexpected revelation of a human tragedy. The approach is quite original for anti-war film," said the Jury Recitation during the announcement of the award.

Synopsis
Vanni Mouse is a short film following the journey of two mice which flew from the wood of Vanni. The two inseparable couple end unfortunately in an internment camp (Manik Farm) located in Vavuniya (Sri Lanka) where hundreds of thousands tamils are imprisoned by the Sri Lankan government. These two mice witness the tragedy of many innocent civilians behind the barbed wires, which remains as unspoken truth. Whether the two will escape from the terrifying environment is the climax of this short film.

Awards
Best Short film 4th Ulagayutha International Tamil film festival India 2011.
Second Prize Makkal TV Ten Minute Stories India 2010.
Best Critic Award 8th International Tamil Film Festival Canada 2010.
Best Fiction Award 11th International Short and Independent Film Festival (ISIFF) in Dhaka 2010.
Special Prize Tamil film festival Norway 2010
Special Prize Periyar thirai 2009

Official selection
14th Jihlava International Documentary Film Festival Czech Republic 2010
9th International Documentary and Short Film Festival (DokuFest) Kosovo 2010
The European Independent Film Festival 2010
Vibgyor International Film Festival 2010 under theme "Focus of the Year: `South Asia

References

External links
Director Balu Mahendra about Vanni Mouse
Poet Kasi Ananthan  about Vanni Mouse
Vanni Mouse on Facebook
Vanni Mouse
IMDB
One of best 35 Tamil Short films
YouTube Vanni Mouse Short Film

Anti-war films
Sri Lankan Tamil-language films
Refugee camps in Sri Lanka
Films about the Sri Lankan Civil War
Fictional mice and rats
2009 short films
2009 films
2000s Tamil-language films
2000s political films
2000s war films